The United States Air Force's 1st Space Launch Squadron was a space launch unit located at Cape Canaveral Air Force Station, Florida. It was responsible for USAF Delta II launches from its activation in October 1990 to its inactivation in August 2009.

History
Air Force launch operations were transferred from Air Force Systems Command to Air Force Space Command in the early 1990s.  Phase I of the Launch Transfer Plan began on 1 October 1990, with the redesignation of the Eastern and Western Space and Missile Centers, as the 30th and 45th Space Wings.

The 1st Space Launch Squadron was activated on 1 October 1990 and became Air Force Space Command's first Delta II launch squadron. Its final launch of a Delta II was on 17 August 2009. Its final launch successfully placed the USA-206, or GPS IIR-21(M) navigation satellite into orbit.  The squadron was inactivated on 30 September.

Lineage
 Constituted as the 1st Space Launch Squadron on 11 September 1990
 Activated on 1 October 1990
 Inactivated on 30 September 2009

Assignments
 Eastern Space and Missile Center, 1 October 1990
 45th Operations Group, 12 November 1991
 45th Launch Group, 1 December 2003 – 30 September 2009

Stations
 Cape Canaveral Air Force Station, Florida, 1 October 1990 – 30 September 2009

Space Launch Vehicles
 Delta II, 1990-2009

References

Notes

External links
 United States Air Force: Patrick Air Force Base

0001
Space Launch 0001